Carl Christopher Perkins (born August 6, 1954) is an American lawyer and politician who served as the United States representative from the 7th district of Kentucky from 1984 to 1993. Perkins served as a Democrat.  He was convicted on three federal felony corruption charges.

Biography
Perkins is the son of Carl D. Perkins, who represented Kentucky in the House of Representatives from 1949 to 1984. Perkins was born in Washington, D.C. and graduated from Fort Hunt High School, Alexandria, Virginia in 1972. He earned his B.A. from Davidson College in 1976. In 1978, he earned a J.D. degree from the University of Louisville. He worked for some time as a lawyer in private practice.

From 1981 to 1984, he was a member of the Kentucky House of Representatives.

Perkins was elected simultaneously as a Democrat to the 98th and the 99th Congress by special election to fill the vacancy caused by the death of his father. Perkins was reelected to the three succeeding Congresses (November 6, 1984 – January 3, 1993). The seat that he held, Kentucky's 7th district, was eliminated by redistricting and became Kentucky's 5th district and some counties in Kentucky's 4th district. He did not seek re-election to Congress in 1992 from the new 5th district, in part due to the House banking scandal.

In 1994, Perkins agreed to plead guilty on three felony charges in connection with the House banking scandal. The following year, he was sentenced to 21 months in federal prison for misusing hundreds of thousands of dollars in campaign contributions and improperly obtaining bank loans. He was also placed on three years' supervised probation, ordered to perform 250 hours of community service, and told to complete any treatment for alcoholism deemed necessary by his probation officer.

After his release from prison, Perkins attended Louisville Seminary and became an ordained Presbyterian minister, serving a church in Ezel, Kentucky.

See also
List of American federal politicians convicted of crimes
List of federal political scandals in the United States

References

External links
 

|-

1954 births
American Presbyterian ministers
Davidson College alumni
Democratic Party members of the United States House of Representatives from Kentucky
Kentucky lawyers
Kentucky politicians convicted of crimes
Living people
Louisville Presbyterian Theological Seminary alumni
Democratic Party members of the Kentucky House of Representatives
People from Knott County, Kentucky
University of Louisville alumni